Lieutenant George Rensbury Hicks  (24 January 1900 – 24 November 1951) was a First World War flying ace credited with eight aerial victories.

Biography
Hicks was born in Walthamstow, Essex, to George and Matilda Ann Hicks on 24 January 1900.

During the First World War, Hicks served with the Artists Rifles as a private up until 3 November 1917, when he joined the Royal Flying Corps as a lieutenant. Posted to No. 74 (Fighter) Squadron, Hicks achieved all eight of his victories in the Royal Aircraft Factory S.E.5a. Hicks scored his first victory on 15 July 1918, shooting down a Fokker D.VII. His second triumph came on 24 July, this time against a DFW C.V. Hicks shot down another DFW C.V on 19 August. His fourth and fifth victories both came on 5 September 1918, with Hicks shooting down two Fokker D.VIIs, becoming an ace. 24 September saw Hicks achieve another two triumphs in one day – shooting down a Siemens-Schuckert D.IV and an unknown Rumpler biplane. Two days later saw his last victory of the war, when Hicks shot down another Fokker D.VII. Hicks was wounded in action on 2 October 1918.

On 3 June 1919, Hicks was awarded the Distinguished Flying Cross.

Hicks died on 24 November 1951 in West Derby.

References

1900 births
1951 deaths
Royal Air Force personnel of World War I
British World War I flying aces
Recipients of the Distinguished Flying Cross (United Kingdom)
British Army personnel of World War I
Artists' Rifles soldiers
Royal Flying Corps officers